WXTA (97.9 FM) is a commercial radio station in Edinboro, Pennsylvania, broadcasting to the Erie, Pennsylvania area owned by Cumulus Media, WXTA airs a country music format branded as "Nash FM 97-9". WXTA's studios are located at 471 Robison Rd W, in Erie while its transmitter is located near Oliver Rd and Golden Rd south of Erie.

History
Signing-on in October 1988 as WMYJ, the station operated with an Adult Contemporary format for a year as "Y-98."

WMYJ was purchased by Bob Winters (WinCapp Broadcasting) over the summer of 1989. The format switch to country happened at noon on September 11, 1989, and the station took the calls WXTA.

WXTA was sold to Jim Embrescia's Media One Group in 1996, Regent Communications (now known today as Townsquare Media) in 1999, Citadel Broadcasting in 2004, and Cumulus Media in 2011.

Former air personalities at WXTA include "Uncle Fred" Horton, Bobby Reed, Ron Kline, Mike McKay, Natalie Massing, John Cunningham, "Big John" Jacobs, Ed Beeler, Bobbi Weston, Brian Williams, Rick Shigo, Chris Atkins, Dale Thompson, Chet Price, Bill Shannon, Laura Luke, Jim Mirabello, Adam Reese, John Gallagher, Tom Lavery, Sammy James, Jay Foyst, Herb Palmer, Dan "Shoeless" Sheldon, Ellie McVay, Truckin' Tom, Cindy Wear, Becca Lynn and the syndicated "Big D & Bubba."

Former syndicated programming on WXTA includes "After Midnite with Blair Garner", "Country Gold Saturday Night" and "Neon Nights with Lia".

Morning Personality "Uncle Fred" Horton died on March 4, 2008.

Current on-air personalities include Mike Sheffield, Jim Griffey, Nicole Dohoda and Chuck Stevens. Stevens is also the stations Program Director.

On-air features include Sheffield in the Morning (Mike Sheffield), Country Cartunes at 5, Kickin' it with Kix (Kix Brooks), and Retro Country.

On February 3, 2014, WXTA along with 9 other Cumulus-owned country music stations made the switch to going under the Nash FM branding.

Former logo

References

External links
WXTA official website

XTA
Cumulus Media radio stations
Radio stations established in 1988